The Cabinet of the Faroe Islands (Faroese: Føroya Landsstýri) has been the chief executive body and the government of the Faroe Islands since the islands became self-governing in 1948. The cabinet is led by the prime minister (løgmaður). There are around seven members of the Cabinet, known as "ministers" (landsstýrismaður or landsstýriskvinna), all of whom are also heads of specific government ministries. The ministers are appointed by the prime minister. The Faroese government currently consists of seven ministers including the prime minister.

List of cabinets of the Faroe Islands since 1948

See also

Løgting
Politics of the Faroe Islands

References

External links 
 Tinganes.fo - The Faroese Prime Minister's Office

 
Faroe Islands
Politics of the Faroe Islands
Cabinets